Give is the fourth studio album by the Israeli electronica-world fusion trio Balkan Beat Box.

Critical reception

Give received generally favorable reviews from critics, with the exception of a D− from Consequence of Sound's Alex Young. Young wrote that on the album, "the band is able to put checkmarks in all the Balkan Beat Box boxes but fail to meet the standards they set previously in any of them."

Track listing

Charts

Personnel 

 Tomer Yosef - lead vocals, percussion, samples
 Ori Kaplan - saxophone
 Tamir Muskat - drums, percussion, programming

References 

Balkan Beat Box albums
2012 albums
Crammed Discs albums